The Candidates Tournament (or in some periods Candidates Matches) is a chess tournament organized by FIDE, chess's international governing body, since 1950, as the final contest to determine the challenger for the World Chess Championship. The winner of the Candidates earns the right to a match for the World Championship against the incumbent World Champion.

Before 1993 it was contested as a triennial tournament; almost always held every third year from 1950 to 1992 inclusive. After the split of the World Championship in the early 1990s, the cycles were disrupted, even after the reunification of the titles in 2006. Since 2013 it has settled into a 2-year cycle: qualification for Candidates during the odd numbered year, Candidates played early in the even numbered year, and the World Championship match played late in the even numbered year. The latter half of the 2020 Candidates Tournament got suspended due to the COVID-19 pandemic and was only played in April 2021. The latest tournament, the 2022 Candidates Tournament, took place as scheduled in 2022.

Precursors
Before 1950, a number of tournaments acted as de facto candidates tournaments:

 The London 1883 chess tournament established Johannes Zukertort and Wilhelm Steinitz as the best two players in the world, and was one of the important events leading to the first official world championship match between the two, in 1886.
 The Saint Petersburg 1895-96 chess tournament, in which world champion Emanuel Lasker finished first and Steinitz finished second, led to Steinitz gaining support for an 1897 rematch, which Lasker won.
 The AVRO 1938 chess tournament was held partly to choose a challenger for Alexander Alekhine. Paul Keres won on tie-breaks, but World War II prevented the match from happening.

Organization

The number of players in the tournament varied over the years, between eight and fifteen players. Most of these qualified from Interzonal tournaments, though some gained direct entry without having to play the Interzonal.

The first Interzonal/Candidates World Championship cycle began in 1948.  Before 1965, the tournament was organized in a round-robin format. From 1965 on, the tournament was played as knockout matches, spread over several months. In 1995–1996, the defending FIDE champion (Anatoly Karpov) also entered the Candidates, in the semi-finals, so the winner was the FIDE world champion.

During its 1993 to 2006 split from FIDE, the "Classical" World Championship also held three Candidates Tournaments (in 1994–1995, 1998 and 2002) under a different sponsor and a different format each time. In one of these cases (Alexei Shirov in 1998) no title match eventuated, under disputed circumstances (see Classical World Chess Championship 2000).

After the reunification of titles in 2006, FIDE tried different Candidates formats in 2007, 2009 and 2011, before settling on an 8 player, double round robin Candidates tournament from 2013 onwards.

Results of Candidates Tournaments

The tables below show the qualifiers and results for all interzonal, Candidates and world championship tournaments.
 Players shown bracketed in italics (Bondarevsky, Euwe, Fine and Reshevsky in 1950, Botvinnik in 1965, Fischer in 1977, Carlsen in 2011, and Radjabov in 2020) qualified for the Candidates or were seeded in the Candidates, but did not play.
 Players shown in italics with an asterisk (Stein* in 1962 and again in 1965, and Bronstein* in 1965) were excluded from the Candidates by a rule limiting the number of players from one country.
 Karjakin* in 2022 was disqualified by FIDE after his qualification for the Candidates: the FIDE Ethics and Disciplinary Commission ruled that he breached Article 2.2.10 of the FIDE Code of Ethics after he made public comments approving of the 2022 Russian invasion of Ukraine. He is shown bracketed, in italics, and with an asterisk.
 Players listed after players in italics (Flohr in 1950, Benko in 1962, Geller, Ivkov and Portisch in 1965, Spassky in 1977, Grischuk in 2011, Vachier-Lagrave in 2020, and Ding in 2022) only qualified due to the non-participation (withdrawal) of the bracketed players or players with an asterisk.
Carlsen, the incumbent champion, refused to defend his title in the 2023 championship: his name is struck through.

The "Seeded into Final" column usually refers to the incumbent champion, but this has a different meaning for the World Chess Championship 1948, in which five players were seeded into the championship tournament, the Classical World Chess Championship 2000 in which two players were seeded into the championship final, the FIDE World Chess Championship 2005 in which eight players were seeded into the final championship tournament, and the FIDE World Chess Championship 2007, in which four players were seeded into the final championship tournament. The incumbent champion Magnus Carlsen refused to defend his title at the World Chess Championship 2023 and was replaced by the runner-up of the Candidates Tournament, Ding Liren.

Interzonal and Candidates tournaments (1948–1996)

Split titles (1997–2006)
After 1996, interzonals ceased to exist, but FIDE continued to organize qualifying zonal tournaments.

Reunified title (since 2007)
After the reunification of the FIDE and "classical" titles, the Chess World Cup and FIDE Grand Prix series were introduced as qualification for the Candidates Tournament. The Swiss-system FIDE Grand Swiss was introduced in the latter half of 2019, acting as another qualification path for the 2020 Candidates Tournament.

See also
Development of the Women's World Chess Championship

Notes

References
 FIDE World Championship events 1948-1990, Mark Weeks' chess pages
 World Championship events 1991-present, Mark Weeks' chess pages
 World Championships pages , Rybka Chess Community Forum

 
World Chess Championships
Recurring sporting events established in 1948